Shafiq, Shafik, Shafeeq, Shafique, Shafic, Chafic or Shafeek (Arabic: شفيق, Urdu: شفیق, Romanized: Shafīq) may refer to
Shafiq (name)
Shafiq Mill Colony, a neighbourhood of Gulberg Town in Karachi, Pakistan 
Charles Shafiq Karthiga, a 2015 Tamil thriller film